The Manitoba Labour Party (MLP) was a reformist, non-Marxist labour party in Manitoba, Canada. It was created in early May 1910 as a successor to the province's second Independent Labour Party (1906–08). Former Member of Parliament Arthur Puttee was a leading MLP organizer. The party fielded one candidate in the 1910 provincial election, and also ran candidates at the municipal level.

The party's founding convention declared that "the ultimate object of attainment shall be to preserve to the worker the full product of his toil". The ambiguity of this statement was criticized by the more radical Socialist Party of Canada (SPC), which called for collective ownership in industry.

After the SPC nominated candidates for Winnipeg North and Winnipeg West in the 1910 provincial election, the MLP sought to prevent confrontation and vote-splitting by fielding only one candidate of their own: Fred Dixon in Winnipeg Centre.  Dixon was a moderate reformer, and campaigned in an unofficial alliance with the Manitoba Liberal Party. He was bitterly opposed by the SPC, which belatedly nominated W.S. Cummings to run against him as a spoiler.

Dixon lost to the Conservative Party incumbent, Thomas Taylor, by seventy-three votes. Cummings's ninety-nine votes may have made the difference in the outcome. The SPC was widely blamed for Dixon's loss, and became marginalized in Winnipeg's labour community for the next eight years.

The Manitoba Labour Party dissolved after the 1910 election. In 1912, its leaders formed the Manitoba Labour Representation Committee.

Election results

See also

List of Manitoba political parties
Winnipeg Labour Party
Labour candidates and parties in Canada

External links
Radical Politics in Winnipeg: 1899-1915, A. Ross McCormack

Some of the information in this article has been summarized from the article listed above, and from McCormack's Reformers, rebels, and revolutionaries : the Western Canadian radical movement, 1899-1919 (Toronto, University of Toronto Press, 1977), pp. 90–91. Readers are encouraged to consult this work for more information.

All electoral information is taken from Elections Manitoba.

Provincial political parties in Manitoba
Defunct political parties in Canada
Political parties established in 1910
1910 establishments in Manitoba
Political parties disestablished in 1910
1910 disestablishments in Canada